The 1936–37 Drexel Dragons men's basketball team represented Drexel Institute of Technology during the 1936–37 men's basketball season. The Dragons, led by 5th year head coach Ernest Lange, played their home games at Curtis Hall Gym and were members of the Eastern Pennsylvania Collegiate Basketball League (EPCBL).

Roster

Schedule

|-
!colspan=9 style="background:#F8B800; color:#002663;"| Regular season
|-

Awards
Matthew Donaldson
EPCBL All-Conference Second Team

David Curry
EPCBL All-Conference Honorable Mention

Theodore Layton
EPCBL All-Conference Honorable Mention

William Lignelli
EPCBL All-Conference Honorable Mention

References

Drexel Dragons men's basketball seasons
Drexel
Drexel Dragons Men's Basketball
Drexel Dragons Men's Basketball